K.D. (also known as KD Engira Karuppudurai or simply Karuppudurai), is a 2019 Indian Tamil-language comedy drama film written and directed by Madhumita and produced by Yoodlee Films, a production venture of Saregama India Limited. The film stars Mu Ramaswamy and Naga Vishal. The film has music composed by Karthikeya Murthy. Nagavishal won  Best Child Actor National Award in 2021 and Best Actor Award at the Jagran Film Festival 2019. Madhumita was awarded the Best Director at the UK Asian Film Festival 2019. K.D. released worldwide on 22 November 2019.

Plot 
Karuppu Durai, an 80-year-old man, bedridden for the past three months in a coma, suddenly wakes up one fine day to overhear his family planning to kill him by performing an ancient euthanasia or thalaikoothal ritual. Hurt, heartbroken, and afraid, Karuppu Durai runs away from the only home he has ever known. On an aimless path with nowhere to go, he accidentally meets a 8-year-old orphan named Kutty. Kutty is everything that Karuppu Durai is not: smart, spunky and full of life. The fiercely independent Kutty encourages KD to chalk out a bucket list and start living for himself. Thus begins an eventful road trip of this unlikely pair - an old man running away from his family and a young boy who never had one. The duo set out to complete KD's bucket list during which a strong bond forms between the two. Eventually, Kutty gets an offer to get admitted in a school in Chennai, and KD, although initially hesitant to let him, decides that Kutty should go to Chennai to lead a good life. KD then returns to his home, and signs the document handing over the property to his sons. The morning before KD's family decides to kill him by performing euthanasia, KD leaves his family once again for good

Cast 

 Mu Ramaswamy as Karuppudurai alias KD
 Naga Vishal as Kutty
 Yog Japee as Easan, the tracker
 Badava Gopi as Gurukal, the temple priest
 Ganesan Kaliamoorthy as Muthu, the koothu artiste
 Guna Babu as Raja
 Pari as Ganesan
 Jawarhlal as Thyagu
 Gabriella Sellus as Selvi
 Jyothi as Pichai
 Gnasekaran as Palani
 Arunika as Lakshmi
 Bhagyalakahmi as Chitra
 Bharath Nellaiyappan as Muni
 Krishna as Velu
 Mahesh as Dharmakartha
 Ramar as Kodangi
 Vijaylakshmi as Valli

Awards and nominations

Soundtrack 

Karthikeya Murthy wrote and composed music for this film, consisting of 3 songs apart from the OST. The album & OST received positive reviews from critics with Times of India reviewing the music as "jaunty and moving in the right places, do the magic" and Firstpost said "With a bubbly score that feels like childlike mischief made tangible" amongst others.

Critical response 
KD (a) Karuppu Durai opened to strong critical acclaim with Times of India, The New Indian Express, The Indian Express and several other critics giving 4/5, while popular Tamil weekly Ananda Vikatan gave a very positive review and 48 marks for the movie.
Baradwaj Rangan of Film Companion South wrote "One part of why KD is so entertaining is the chemistry between the old man and the young boy — the other part is that their characters have been sketched out so well. Mu Ramaswamy plays Karuppudurai movingly, but with a twinkle in the eye".

Jigar Ganatra of Mumbai Live gave the film 4.5 stars and wrote "Madhumita's vision to share a message thereby connecting emotionally with the audience comes across thoroughly in this project. KD aka Karuppudurai is more like embarking on a journey only two observe the lives of two beautiful souls who have no other intention but to keep each other happy and entertained. This film, as expected, fills your heart with various emotions."

References

External links 

2019 films
Indian comedy-drama films
2019 comedy-drama films